Microcondylaea bonellii is a species of bivalve belonging to the family Unionidae. The species is endemic to South Europe. 

Microcondylaea bonellii is a freshwater bivalve occurring in both rivers and lakes. It is known from Switzerland, Italy, Croatia, and Lake Ohrid in Albania/North Macedonia. However, it is extinct in Switzerland and possibly extinct in Lake Ohrid. The only known viable populations are in northern Italy and Croatia.

References

Unionidae
Freshwater animals of Europe
Bivalves of Europe
Bivalves described in 1827
Taxa named by André Étienne d'Audebert de Férussac